Boneh-ye Qeytas (also Romanized as Boneh-ye Qeyţās) is a village in Soltanabad Rural District, in the Central District of Ramhormoz County, Khuzestan Province, Iran. At the 2006 census, its population was 185, in 44 families.

References 

Populated places in Ramhormoz County